HLA-A3 (A3) is a human leukocyte antigen serotype within HLA-A serotype group. The serotype is determined by the antibody recognition of α3 subset of HLA-A α-chains. For A3, the alpha, "A", chain are encoded by the HLA-A allele group and the β-chain are encoded by B2M locus. This group currently is dominated by A*03:01.  A3 and A are almost synonymous in meaning.
A3 is more common in Europe, it is part of the longest known multigene haplotype, A3~B7~DR15~DQ6.

Serotype
 
A3 is primarily composed of A*03:01 and *03:02 which serotype well with anti-A3 antibodies. 
There are 26 non-synonymous variants of A*03, 4 nulls, and 22 protein variants.

Associated diseases
A3 serotype is a secondary risk factor for myasthenia gravis and lower CD8+ levels in hemochromatosis patients.  The HFE (Hemochromatosis) locus lies between A3 and B7 within the A3~DQ6 superhaplotype.

In HIV
HLA-A3 selects HIV evolution for a mutation Gag KK9 epitope and results in a rapid decline in the CD8 T-cell response. CD8 T-cells are responsible for quickly killing HIV infected CD4+ cells. This type of evolved response may not be specific for HLA-A3 and since HIV is capable of adapting quickly in situ to selective factors.

Alleles

Associated diseases
A*03:01 modulates increased risk for multiple sclerosis

A3~B haplotypes
A3-B7 is part of the A3~DQ2 superhaplotype
A3-B8  (Romania, svanS) 
A3~B35 (Bulgaria, Croatia, E. Black Sea)
A3~B55 (E. Black Sea)

A3~Cw7~B7

A3~B7 is bimodal in frequency in Europe with one node in Ireland and the other in Switzerland, relatively speaking Switzerland appears to be higher. A3~Cw7~B7 is one of the most common multigene haplotypes in the western world, particularly in Central and Eastern Europe.

A ~ C ~ B ~ DRB1 ~ DQA1 ~ DQB1

References

3